The 303rd Aeronautical Systems Wing (303 ASW) was a United States Air Force unit assigned to the Air Force Materiel Command Aeronautical Systems Center, 2005-2010. It was stationed at Wright-Patterson Air Force Base, Ohio as a tenant unit.

The wing was the successor organization to the World War II Eighth Air Force 303rd Bombardment Group. The group was one of the first VIII Bomber Command B-17 Flying Fortress units in England. The "Hell's Angels" were the first B-17 group to complete 25 combat missions in June 1943, going on to fly more than 300 combat missions, more than any other group.  The 359th BS B-17F 41-24605 "Knock-out Dropper" was the first aircraft in Eighth Air Force to complete 50, then 75 missions.

During the Cold War, the Strategic Air Command 303rd Bombardment Wing was a Boeing B-47 Stratojet medium bomber wing in the 1950s, and in the 1980s became a Tactical Missile Wing assigned to the United States Air Forces in Europe.

Overview
Wing responsibilities also included identifying, coordinating, and implementing horizontal integration/capability planning across weapons systems in support of the Global Strike and Global Persistent Attack concept of operations.

History
 For additional history and lineage, see 303d Bombardment Group

Trained for strategic bombardment and air refueling operations to meet Strategic Air Command's global commitments, equipped with B-29 Superfortresses. Deployed to Sidi Slimane AB, French Morocco, 5 Oct-6 Nov 1952.

Replaced the propeller-driven B-29s with new B-47E Stratojet swept-wing medium bombers in 1953, capable of flying at high subsonic speeds and primarily designed for penetrating the airspace of the Soviet Union.   Flew numerous training missions and participated in various SAC exercises and deployments with the Stratojet, deploying to Greenham Common RAF Station, England, 17 Mar-28 Apr 1954; Fairford RAF Station, England, 28 Apr-5 Jun 1954; and Anderson AFB, Guam, 4 Jul-4 Oct 1956 and 5 Apr-5 Jul 1958.

In the early 1960s, the B-47 was considered to be reaching obsolescence, and was being phased out of SAC's strategic arsenal.  Began sending its stratojets to AMARC in 1963, the last being retired in 1964. Wing was inactivated on 15 June 1964 after the last B-47 was retired.

Reactivated as a BGM-109G Gryphon Cruise Missile wing in August 1986. Maintained 64 operational missiles in a combat-ready state. Inactivated in January 1989 as a result of the INF treaty and the elimination of the BGM-109G missile from service.

As part of the Aeronautical Systems Center, the 303d designs, develops and delivers dominant aerospace weapon systems and capabilities for U.S. Air Force, other U.S. military, allied and coalition-partner warfighters, in support of Air Force leadership priorities.

Lineage
 Established as 303d Bombardment Wing, Medium, on 27 August 1951
 Activated on 4 September 1951
 Discontinued, and inactivated, on 15 June 1964
 Redesignated 303d Tactical Missile Wing on 19 August 1986
 Activated on 12 December 1986
 Inactivated on 31 January 1989
 Consolidated (23 Jun 2006) with the 303d Reconnaissance Systems Wing, which was established on 23 November 2004.
 Activated on 18 January 2005
 Redesignated 303d Aeronautical Systems Wing on 14 July 2006.
 Inactivated on 1 July 2010 as it was re-stood up as ASC/WI (Aeronautical Systems Center, ISR Directorate) on the same date.

Assignments
 36th Air Division, 4 September 1951
 Attached to: 5th Air Division, 5 Oct-6 Nov 1952
 Attached to: 7th Air Division, 4 Mar-5 Jun 1954
 Attached to: 3rd Air Division, 4 Jul-4 Oct 1956 and 5 Apr-4 Jul 1958
 12th Air (later, 12 Strategic Aerospace) Division, 15 Mar 1960 – 15 Jun 1964
 Third Air Force, 12 Dec 1986 – 31 Jan 1989
 Aeronautical Systems Center, 18 Jan 2005–present

Components
Group
 303d Bombardment Group: 4 Sep 1951 – 16 Jun 1952 (not operational)

Squadrons
 9th Air Refueling Squadron: attached 15 Jan-5 Oct 1952 and 15 Nov 1952 – 25 Apr 1953
 43rd Air Refueling Squadron: 15 Mar-15 Nov 1960
 303d Air Refueling Squadron: attached 4 Sep 1951 – 8 Apr 1952 (not operational); assigned 18 Feb 1953 – 1 Feb 1956 (detached 19 Apr-2 Jun 1955)
 358th Bombardment Squadron: attached 4 Sep 1951 – 15 Jun 1952, assigned 16 Jun 1952 – 15 Jun 1964
 359th Bombardment Squadron: attached 4 Sep 1951 – 15 Jun 1952, assigned 16 Jun 1952 – 15 Jun 1964
 360th Bombardment Squadron: attached 4 Sep 1951 – 15 Jun 1952, assigned 16 Jun 1952 – 15 Jun 1964
 427th Bombardment Squadron: 1 Dec 1958 – 1 Jan 1962 (not operational, 1 Sep 1961 – 1 Jan 1962)
 87th Tactical Missile Squadron: 12 December 1986 to 31 January 1989
 303d Tactical Missile Maintenance Squadron: 12 December 1986 to 31 January 1989

Detachments: Det, 96th Air Refueling Squadron: attached c. 4 Jul-c. 4 October 1956.

Stations
 Davis-Monthan AFB, Arizona, 4 Sep 1951 – 15 Jun 1964
 RAF Molesworth, England, 12 Dec 1986 – 31 Jan 1989
 BGM-109G Missile site located at: 
 Wright-Patterson AFB, Ohio, 18 Jan 2005–present

Aircraft and missiles
 B-29 Superfortress, 1951–1953
 KB-29 Superfortress (Tanker), 1952, 1952–1953
 B-47 Stratojet, 1953–1964
 KC-97 Stratofreighter, 1953–1956, 1956, 1960
 BGM-109G, GLCM, 1987–1988.

See also
 List of B-29 units of the United States Air Force
 List of B-47 units of the United States Air Force
 List of BGM-109G GLCM Units
 List of United States Air Force missile squadrons

References

 Ravenstein, Charles A. Air Force Combat Wings Lineage and Honors Histories, 1947–1977. Maxwell Air Force Base, Montgomery, Alabama: Office of Air Force History, 1984. .

External links

Wright-Patterson AFB Home Page
303d Aeronautical Systems Wing Factsheet

0303
Military units and formations established in 1951
Military units and formations in Ohio
1951 establishments in Arizona
Military units and formations disestablished in 2010